The Electoral district of County of Northumberland and from 1851, Northumberland and Hunter, was an electorate of the partially elected New South Wales Legislative Council, created for the first elections for the Council in 1843. The County of Northumberland was bounded by the part of the Hawkesbury River to the south, the Macdonald River to the south-west, and the Hunter River to the north, however the electoral district did not include the towns of East Maitland, West Maitland and Newcastle which made up the district of Northumberland Boroughs. Polling took place at Gosford, Newcastle, East Maitland, Wollombi, Singleton and Watson's on the Macdonald River. The County of Hunter was added to the district with the expansion of the Council in 1851 and elected two members.

In 1856 the unicameral Legislative Council was abolished and replaced with an elected Legislative Assembly and an appointed Legislative Council. The district was represented by the Legislative Assembly electorate of Northumberland and Hunter.

Members

Election results

1843

1845

1848

1851

See also
Members of the New South Wales Legislative Council, 1843–1851 and 1851-1856

References

Former electoral districts of New South Wales Legislative Council
1843 establishments in Australia
1856 disestablishments in Australia